Medalie is a surname. Notable people with the surname include:

 Doron Medalie (born 1977), Israeli songwriter
 George Z. Medalie (1883–1946), American judge and politician